Philip J. Brown is a retired American soccer defender who played professionally in the MLS and the USL A-League.

Brown attended the Azusa Pacific, playing on the men's soccer team from 1994 to 1997.  He was a 1996 and 1997 First team All-American NAIA All American. and GSAC CO-Player of the year in 1996. On February 1, 1998, the Colorado Rapids selected Brown in the third round (thirty-fifth overall) of the 1998 MLS College Draft.  In 1999, he signed with the San Diego Flash of the USL A-League.  He remained with the Flash through the 2001 season.  After his retirement, he coached youth soccer.

References

Living people
American soccer coaches
Azusa Pacific Cougars men's soccer players
San Diego Flash players
A-League (1995–2004) players
1973 births
American soccer players
Soccer players from Washington (state)
Colorado Rapids players
Colorado Rapids draft picks
Sportspeople from Bellevue, Washington
Association football defenders